This is a list of video games for the PlayStation 2 video game console that have sold or shipped at least one million copies. The best-selling game on the PlayStation 2 is Grand Theft Auto: San Andreas. An action-adventure game developed by Rockstar North, San Andreas was originally released in North America on October 26, 2004, and went on to sell 17.33million units worldwide. The second-best-selling game on the console is Gran Turismo 3: A-Spec (2001), which sold  units. The top five is rounded out by Gran Turismo 4 (2004) selling 11.76million units, Grand Theft Auto: Vice City (2002) with  units sold, and Final Fantasy X (2001) with 8.5million units sold.

There are a total of 163 PlayStation 2 games on this list which are confirmed to have sold or shipped at least one million units. Of these, 30 were published in one or more regions by Sony Computer Entertainment. Other publishers with multiple million-selling games include EA Sports with twenty games, Electronic Arts with eighteen games, Capcom with fourteen games, Activision and THQ with twelve games each, and Konami with ten games. The developers with the most million-selling games include EA Tiburon with twelve games and Capcom and EA Canada, with nine games each in the list of 113. The most popular franchises on PlayStation 2 include Grand Theft Auto ( combined units), Gran Turismo (29.61million combined units), Madden NFL (23.48million combined units), Final Fantasy ( combined units), and Pro Evolution Soccer ( combined units). The oldest game on this list is Tekken Tag Tournament, first released on the platform on March 30, 2000.

As of March 31, 2007, a total of 1.24billion copies of PlayStation 2 software had been shipped worldwide. Between April 1, 2007, and March 31, 2012, an additional 297.5million copies had been sold. Note that since the former figure refers to shipments and the latter refers to sales, there may be overlap between the two figures.

List

Notes

References

 
PlayStation 2
Best-selling PlayStation 2 video games